Xestiodion pictipes is a species of beetle in the family Cerambycidae. It was described by Edward Newman in 1838.

References

Cerambycini
Beetles described in 1838
Taxa named by Edward Newman